Judith Ann Tickner (born 1937) is an Anglo-American feminist international relations (IR) theorist. Tickner is a distinguished scholar in residence at the School of International Services, American University, Washington DC.

Career
Tickner served as president of the International Studies Association (ISA) from 2006 to 2007. Since 2011, the ISA give out the J. Ann Tickner Award.

After fifteen years as a Professor of International Relations at the University of Southern California, Tickner recently became a distinguished scholar in residence at the School of International Services, American University, Washington DC, On June 4, 1999, Tickner received an honorary doctorate from the Faculty of Social Sciences at Uppsala University, Sweden.

Her books include Gendering World Politics: Issues and Approaches in the Post-Cold War Era (Columbia University Press, 2001), Gender in International Relations: Feminist Perspectives on Achieving International Security (Columbia University Press, 1992), and Self-Reliance Versus Power Politics: American and Indian Experiences in Building Nation-States (Columbia University Press, 1987). One of Tickner's most famous journal articles was the piece "You Just Don't Understand" (International Studies Quarterly (1997) 41, 611-632), which critiqued mainstream international relations theorists for the omission of gender from their theory and practice. Whilst mainstream scholars argued that feminists should develop scientific, falsifiable theories, Tickner argued against this assertion, claiming that it misunderstood one of the premises of feminist IR. Most feminist IR theory takes a strongly deconstructivist approach to knowledge, arguing that theories reflect the gendered social positioning of their authors; they therefore questioned positivist ("scientific") methods for obscuring the gendered politics of knowledge construction. She favors a social, "bottom-up" method of analysis that makes the role of women in IR visible, as opposed to the usual scientific methodologies that are "top-down" and focus on traditionally masculinist subjects, including men, money, and war. Feminist approaches to international relations are a phenomenon of the post–Cold War period. Feminist scholarly research began in the 1980s in various academic disciplines, from literature to psychology to history.

Tickner was married to Hayward Alker until his death in 2007.

Published works 
 Feminism and International Relations: Conversations about the Past, Present and Future, ed. with Laura Sjoberg (Routledge, 2011).
 Gendering World Politics: Issues and Approaches in the Post-Cold War Era (Columbia University Press, 2001).
 Gender in International Relations: Feminist Perspectives on Achieving International Security (Columbia University Press, 1992).
 Self-Reliance Versus Power Politics: American and Indian Experiences in Building Nation-States (Columbia University Press, 1987).

See also 

 Carol Cohn
 Critical international relations theory
 Claire Duncanson
 Cynthia Enloe
 Sara Ruddick

Notes

References 
J. Ann Tickner, short biography on Watson Institute for International Studies
J. Ann Tickner , short biography on Mershon Center for International Security Studies

External links 
 Faculty Profile at American University
 Theory Talks Interview

1937 births
Living people
University of Southern California faculty
American international relations scholars
Constructivist international relations scholars
American feminists
American women political scientists
American political scientists
American women academics
21st-century American women